Sir Edward Brian Stanford Mountain, 4th Baronet of Oare Manor and Brendon (Somerset)  (born 19 March 1961) is a Scottish Conservative politician who has been a Member of the Scottish Parliament (MSP) for the Highlands and Islands region since  2016.

Early life
Mountain joined the Blues and Royals regiment of the British Army from the Royal Military Academy Sandhurst in October 1981. His military service took him to Uganda, Canada, Spain, Cyprus, Germany and Egypt. He left in 1992 and continued to serve as a reservist for six years.

In 1997, Mountain left the army and became a qualified chartered surveyor. He worked as a senior partner for a firm based in Inverness in 2006. The following year he returned home, where he returned to farming. The Mountains own estates in Hampshire and in Strath Spey.

In the 2011 Scottish Parliament election, Mountain stood in the Caithness, Sutherland and Ross constituency where he finished fourth. He stood unsuccessfully in the Inverness, Nairn, Badenoch and Strathspey constituency in the 2015 United Kingdom general election and in the 2016 Scottish Parliament election he stood as the Conservative candidate for the Inverness and Nairn, coming second to Fergus Ewing.

Member of the Scottish Parliament
Although Mountain failed to win the Inverness and Nairn constituency, he was elected as an additional member for the Scottish Parliament for the Highlands and Islands region. In the 5th Scottish Parliament, he was the Scottish Conservatives' spokesperson for land reform.

In the 2021 Scottish Parliament election, Mountain retained his seat as an additional member. He is the Deputy Chief Whip and Shadow Minister for Veterans.

References

External links
 

Living people
Place of birth missing (living people)
Conservative MSPs
Members of the Scottish Parliament 2016–2021
Blues and Royals officers
Scottish farmers
People from Moray
Baronets in the Baronetage of the United Kingdom
Edward
Chartered Surveyors
Alumni of the Royal Agricultural University
1961 births
Graduates of the Royal Military Academy Sandhurst
Members of the Scottish Parliament 2021–2026